Pavel Stratan (born 11 November 1970) is a Moldovan popular singer. His first album, Amintiri din copilărie, was released in 2002.

Early life
Pavel Stratan was born to Dumitru and Polixena Stratan in the village of Nişcani, Călărași, Moldovan SSR on 11 November 1970.

He first played the guitar on stage at school in 1977. He wrote his first lyrics in 1983, and in 1996 he had his first real show-business experience as a sleight-of-hand artist.

He graduated from the Academy of Music, Theatre and Plastic Arts in Chişinău, Moldova.

Career
In 2002, he launched his first album, Amintiri din copilărie (Childhood Memories), in Moldova. It went on to sell over 50,000 copies in Moldova. In 2004, it was released in Romania, where it sold very well and where Stratan became widely known.

Under Cat Music, Stratan has since released three other albums: Amintiri din copilărie, vol. 2 in 2004, Amintiri din copilărie, vol. 3 in 2008, and Amintiri din copilărie, vol. 4 in 2011.

Stratan's music has been described as a mixture of folk, pop, and hip hop

Personal life
Stratan is now living in Pipera in the capital of Romania, Bucharest with his wife Rodica, an engineer, daughter Cleopatra (b. October 2002), and son, Cezar (b. December 2008). The family moved to Romania from Moldova in 2011. His daughter entered the Guinness World Records as the youngest person ever to score commercial success at the age of three, with her song "Ghiţă", which became a No. 1 hit in Romania.

Discography
 Amintiri din copilărie 2002
 Amintiri din copilărie, vol. 2 (2004)
 Amintiri din copilărie, vol. 3 (2008)
 Amintiri din copilărie, vol. 4 (2011)

References

External links
 Official website

1970 births
Living people
People from Călărași District
21st-century Moldovan male singers
Folk-pop singers
Moldovan emigrants to Romania